O'Herlihy is a surname of Irish origin. The principal concentrations of O'Herlihy are found in County Cork.

Persons with the surname
 Bill O'Herlihy (1938–2015), Irish public relations executive and television broadcaster.
 Dan O'Herlihy (1919–2005), Irish actor.
 Gavan O'Herlihy (1954–2021), Irish actor
 Lorcan O'Herlihy (born 1959), Irish architect.
 Micaela O'Herlihy, multimedia artist.
 Michael O'Herlihy (1929–1997), Irish television producer and director.

See also
 Hurley (surname)
 O'Hurley (surname)

References